San Xoán de Ortoño is a town in the south of the municipality of Ames. It has 6,161 inhabitants (3,171 women and 2,990 men).

Province of A Coruña